Paso Hospital or Hospital is a village in the Rivera Department of northeastern Uruguay.

Population
In 2011 Paso Hospital had a population of 295.
 
Source: Instituto Nacional de Estadística de Uruguay

References

External links
INE map of Paso Hospital

Populated places in the Rivera Department